Lemoyne is a borough in Cumberland County, Pennsylvania,  United States, which lies across the Susquehanna River from Harrisburg, Pennsylvania's capital. It is part of the Harrisburg–Carlisle metropolitan statistical area. Lemoyne was incorporated as a borough on May 23, 1905. As of the 2010 census, the borough population was 4,553. Lemoyne is served by Interstate 83 and U.S. Routes 11/15. Lemoyne is a part of the West Shore School District.

Name
Following the 1724 stone house built by John Harris and John Kelso, the emerging settlement was first named by Thomas Penn as the "Manor of Lowther" in 1750. Once the camelback bridge was completed in 1815, the town became "Bridgeport". In 1888, the name was then changed to "Riverton"; once the population of 800 was reached, which was needed to obtain a Post Office, it was denied out of possible confusion for Riverton, Virginia. Therefore in 1905 it was finally renamed "Lemoyne", said to be in honor of Charles le Moyne, a French soldier who supposedly settled near Harrisburg following an Ohio expedition. Another possible theory was that it was named in honor of Dr. Francis J. LeMoyne.

Geography
Lemoyne is located on the eastern edge of Cumberland County at  (40.244217, -76.899119), on the west bank of the Susquehanna River, directly across from Harrisburg. It is bordered to the north by Wormleysburg, to the west by Camp Hill, and to the south by the borough of New Cumberland and Lower Allen Township.

Demographics

Age and gender

Race and Hispanic or Latino origin

Households and families
There were  households, with  being considered families.

Notable people

 Coy Wire, sport anchor
 Bob Adams, baseball pitcher
 Edson Hendricks, computer scientist
 Stan Jones, football player
 Paul Minner, baseball pitcher
 Bob Moorhead, baseball pitcher
 Andy Musser, sports announcer
 Dean T. Stevenson, Episcopal bishop
 Helen Waddell, baseball player

References

External links

Pennsylvania populated places on the Susquehanna River
Populated places established in 1905
Harrisburg–Carlisle metropolitan statistical area
Boroughs in Cumberland County, Pennsylvania
1905 establishments in Pennsylvania